This is a list of notable events in country music that took place in 1962.

Events
 September 25 – Loretta Lynn is inducted into the Grand Ole Opry at 30 years of age.
 November 3 — Billboard renames its Hot C&W Sides chart "Hot Country Singles," a name it will keep for the next 27 years. The chart length remains 30 positions.

No dates
 Rhythm and blues singer Ray Charles releases his landmark album Modern Sounds in Country and Western Music. The album of pop-styled covers of country standards is vastly influential in the genre.

Top hits of the year

Number one hits

United States
(as certified by Billboard)

Notes
1^ No. 1 song of the year, as determined by Billboard.
2^ Song dropped from No. 1 and later returned to top spot.
A^ First Billboard No. 1 hit for that artist.
B^ Last Billboard No. 1 hit for that artist.
C^ Only Billboard No. 1 hit for that artist to date.

Other major hits

Top new album releases

Other top releases

Births
 January 13 — Trace Adkins, singer-songwriter whose style meshes honky-tonk and dance-influenced rock.
 February 4 — Clint Black, first major new star of the 1990s and key player in the new traditionalist movement.
 February 6 — Richie McDonald, former lead singer of Lonestar.
 February 7 — Garth Brooks, the man who revolutionalized country music and forever changed its direction during the 1990s.
 February 11 — Sheryl Crow, pop singer who has also had substantial success as a country singer starting in the 2000s.
 April 2 — Billy Dean, contemporary-styled singer-songwriter who had the peak of his success in the 1990s.
 May 2 — Ty Herndon, contemporary-styled singer who had most of his success in the mid-to-late 1990s.
 August 23 — Emilio Navaira, singer-songwriter of country and Tejano music (died 2016).
 November 26 — Linda Davis, prominent backing vocalist who had a series of solo hits in the 1990s.

Deaths

Country Music Hall of Fame Inductees
Roy Acuff (1903–1992)

Major awards

Grammy Awards
Best Country and Western Recording — "Funny Way of Laughin'", Burl Ives

Further reading
Kingsbury, Paul, "The Grand Ole Opry: History of Country Music. 70 Years of the Songs, the Stars and the Stories," Villard Books, Random House; Opryland USA, 1995
Kingsbury, Paul, "Vinyl Hayride: Country Music Album Covers 1947–1989," Country Music Foundation, 2003
Millard, Bob, "Country Music: 70 Years of America's Favorite Music," HarperCollins, New York, 1993
Whitburn, Joel, "Top Country Songs 1944–2005 – 6th Edition." 2005.

Other links
Country Music Association
Inductees of the Country Music Hall of Fame

External links
Country Music Hall of Fame

Country
Country music by year